Sowmaeh-ye Olya (also Romanized as Şowma‘eh-ye ‘Olyā and Şowme‘eh-ye ‘Olyā; also known as Şowma‘eh-ye Bālā and Şowme‘eh Bālā) is a village in Barvanan-e Sharqi Rural District of Torkamanchay District, Mianeh County, East Azerbaijan province, Iran. At the 2006 National Census, its population was 3,014 in 765 households. The following census in 2011 counted 3,123 people in 918 households. The latest census in 2016 showed a population of 2,432 people in 791 households; it was the largest village in its rural district.

References 

Meyaneh County

Populated places in East Azerbaijan Province

Populated places in Meyaneh County